Wadi Sabra, is a canyon wadi in Jordan noted for its ruins.

The Wadi has several unexcavated tombs and houses. There is also ruins of a theater, a Nabataean sanctuary and Bronze Age petroglyphs along its walls.   
The Wadi is 8 kilometers south of Petra.

The first European to the wadi was the Frenchman L. de Laborde, who reached Wadi Sabra in 1828.

References

External links 
Archive photos of Wadi Sabra at the Manar al-Athar photo archive

Rivers of Jordan